Jon Eilert Bøgseth (born 22 February 1959) is a Norwegian former ski jumper.

References

External links

1959 births
Living people
Norwegian male ski jumpers